The current Constitution of Ireland came into effect on 29 December 1937, repealing and replacing the Constitution of the Irish Free State, having been approved in a national plebiscite on 1 July 1937 with the support of 56.5% of voters in the then Irish Free State. The Constitution was closely associated with Éamon de Valera, the President of the Executive Council of the Irish Free State at the time of its approval (and who assumed the position of Taoiseach on its adoption).

Background
The Constitution of Ireland replaced the Constitution of the Irish Free State, which had come into force on 6 December 1922, marking the state's independence from the United Kingdom.

1922 Constitution

The original text of the 1922 Constitution was a schedule to the Constitution of the Irish Free State (Saorstát Eireann) Act 1922, passed by the Third Dáil sitting as a Constituent Assembly on 25 October 1922. This Act has subsequently been regarded by Irish courts as sufficient in itself to bring the Constitution into effect. However, the view of the British government at the time was different, and the Parliament of the United Kingdom passed on 5 December 1922 its own act, the Irish Free State Constitution Act 1922, with the entire Irish Act as a schedule, to give effect to the Constitution in British law.

Under the 1922 Constitution amendments were governed by Article 50. Article 50, at the time the 1937 Constitution was adopted, provided that constitutional amendments could be enacted by the Oireachtas (parliament) under the same procedure used for the adoption of ordinary laws. De Valera's government repudiated the 1922 Constitution as an unrepublican, foreign imposition and so deliberately provided that the new constitution would be adopted by in a manner outside the terms of the 1922 Constitution.

Motivation for change
There were two main motivations for replacing the constitution in 1937. Firstly, the Irish Free State constitution of 1922 was, in the eyes of many, associated with the Anglo-Irish Treaty. The largest political group in the anti-treaty faction, who opposed the treaty initially by force of arms, had boycotted the institutions of the new Irish Free State until 1926. In 1932 they were elected into power as the Fianna Fáil party.

After 1932, some of the articles of the original Constitution which were required by the Anglo-Irish Treaty were dismantled by acts of the Oireachtas, as permitted in British law by the Statute of Westminster 1931. These amendments removed references to the Oath of Allegiance, appeals to the United Kingdom's Judicial Committee of the Privy Council, the British Crown and the Governor General. The sudden abdication of Edward VIII in December 1936 was quickly used to redefine the royal connection via the Executive Authority (External Relations) Act 1936. Nevertheless, the Fianna Fáil government, led by Éamon de Valera, still desired to replace the constitutional document they saw as having been imposed by the UK government in 1922. The desire to replace the Constitution of the Irish Free State was motivated largely by the association of the existing constitution with the Anglo-Irish Treaty, and a belief that it had been imposed upon Ireland by the government of the United Kingdom. The main opponents of the Treaty had been elected to power as Fianna Fáil under Éamon de Valera in 1932, and a commitment was made to replace the constitution of the Free State. So closely tied to the policies of Fianna Fáil was the proposed new constitution that the 1937 referendum has been described as a vote of confidence in the republican government. After a new constitution was drafted by John Hearne, supervised by de Valera, the draft was accepted by the Oireachtas. The Oireachtas passed the Plebiscite (Draft Constitution) Act 1937, which allowed for a plebiscite to be held so that the people of Ireland could either accept or reject the new constitution.

The second motive for replacing the original constitution was primarily symbolic. De Valera wanted to put an Irish stamp on the institutions of government, and chose to do this in particular through the use of Irish-language nomenclature.

Drafting process
De Valera as President of the Executive Council personally supervised the writing of the Constitution. It was drafted initially by John Hearne, legal adviser to the Department of External Affairs. De Valera served as his own External Affairs Minister, hence the use of the Department's Legal Advisor, with whom he had previously worked closely, as opposed to the Attorney General or someone from the Department of the President of the Executive Council. He also received significant input from John Charles McQuaid, the Catholic Archbishop of Dublin, on religious, educational, family and social welfare issues.  The text was translated into Irish over a number of drafts by a group headed by Micheál Ó Gríobhtha (assisted by Risteárd Ó Foghludha), who worked in the Department of Education.

A draft of the constitution was presented personally to the Vatican for review and comment on two occasions by the Department Head at External Relations, Joseph P. Walsh. Prior to its tabling in Dáil Éireann and presentation to the Irish electorate in a plebiscite, Vatican Secretary of State Cardinal Eugenio Pacelli, the future Pope Pius XII, said about the final amended draft, "I do not approve, neither do I disapprove; We shall maintain silence." The quid pro quo for this indulgence of the Catholic Church's interests in Ireland was the degree of respectability which it conferred on De Valera's formerly denounced republican faction and its reputation as the 'semi-constitutional' political wing of the 'irregular' anti-treaty forces.

Dáil debate
The draft constitution was approved by the Oireachtas before being put to a vote. The Free State Oireachtas was originally bicameral, consisting of the Dáil and the Seanad or Senate, as well as the Governor-General, who gave royal assent to bills to enact them. However, the Seanad and Governor-General had been abolished in 1936, so that once passed by the Dáil, a bill became law on the signature of the Ceann Comhairle.

The Constitution was not presented as a bill for enactment by the Oireachtas. Instead, the standing orders of the Dáil were changed so that it could pass a resolution by which it "approved" the draft constitution without it therefore immediately becoming law. The draft Constitution was introduced in Dáil on 10 March 1937, and was processed in the same manner as a bill, with first and second stages, committee and report stages, and a final stage on 14 June. Some amendments were made during these stages; notably, the name of the state was changed from Éire to "Éire, or in the English language, Ireland".

Positions on Draft Constitution

Supporters of replacing the Irish Free State Constitution were largely sympathetic to the Fianna Fáil party, or republicans who believed in removing the remaining constitutional and legal links to the British state. Opponents of the new constitution included a coalition of supporters of Fine Gael and the Labour Party, and former unionists who were concerned about permanently losing the last vestiges of Britain's influence on the institutions of Irish government. The National University Women Graduates' Association opposed the new constitution on the basis that it could undermine women's rights and privacy in the home.

Plebiscite
The framers of the 1937 Constitution decided that it would be enacted not by an elected body but by the people themselves by means of a plebiscite. The preamble to the 1937 Constitution is thus written in the name not of the legislature but of "We, the people of Éire".  The Oireachtas on 2 June 1937 passed the Plebiscite (Draft Constitution) Act 1937, which mandated the holding of a plebiscite on the draft constitution on the same date as the next general election. The Dáil was dissolved as soon as it had approved the draft constitution on 14 June 1937. The ensuing general election was held on 1 July 1937, and the plebiscite was held in parallel.

It was the only statewide plebiscite or referendum to take place in the Irish Free State. (The term referendum is used in Irish law where the question is enactment of a bill; plebiscite is used for other questions.) The question put to voters was: 
It was passed with 56.5% of those voting in favour, comprising 38.6% of the total electorate.

The number of invalid or blank votes was high at almost 10% of the total votes cast. The 'Yes' vote won a majority in all but five of the thirty four constituencies, representing a solid level of support across Ireland. In a further six constituencies (Cavan, Cork North, Cork South-East, Leitrim, Roscommon, and Wexford), the majority for 'Yes' was less than the number of spoilt votes (spoilt votes also exceeded the 'No' majority in four of the five constituencies that voted 'No', the exception being Dublin Townships). Geographically, the 'No' vote was strongest in the constituencies of Dublin County and Wicklow, and in Cork West. The draft constitution had least support in Dublin Townships, and gained most support in Galway West, where three-quarters of voters backed the proposal. The plebiscite vote was heavily influenced by party political loyalties. Fianna Fáil voters overwhelmingly voted 'Yes', while Fine Gael voters and Protestants largely voted 'No'. The bulk of Labour voters supported the new constitution, despite the opposition of the party leadership.

Legal basis of enactment
There were diverging views on whether the 1937 Constitution of Ireland was a revolutionary breach of legal continuity with the 1922 Constitution it replaced. There are two main arguments that it was:
The method used conflicted with the method set down in the 1922 Constitution. The 1922 Constitution provided that constitutional amendments be enacted in the same manner as ordinary laws, i.e. as Acts of the Oireachtas. However, the 1937 Constitution was not an Act of the Oireachtas. Instead, it was "approved" by the Dáil and then submitted to the people in a plebscite and only deemed to have become law once voters had endorsed it.
The second and related argument was that the 1937 Constitution purported to repeal the 1922 Constitution even though the 1922 Constitution did not explicitly grant the Oireachtas the power to do so. However the Judicial Committee of the Privy Council had previously ruled in Moore v. Attorney General of Ireland (1935) that following the Statute of Westminster (1931) the Irish Free State legislature had gained the unfettered power to pass legislation and thus amend the constitution in a manner repugnant to imperial acts, and it had successfully removed any right to petition the Privy Council.

The Department of External Affairs notified foreign governments only of the change of name; it did not re-accredit diplomats as would be expected were the post-1937 Ireland a successor state of the previous Irish Free State.

Coming into force
The date of the coming into operation of the Constitution was contained in Article 62, a transitory provision of the Constitution which is omitted from the official published text. Article 48 provides that the Constitution of the Irish Free State is repealed as of that date.

No resolution of the Dáil was passed by the 9th Dáil, which was elected the same day as the plebiscite on the Constitution, and the Constitution came into force on 29 December 1937, 180 days after the plebiscite. Consequential acts were passed between July and December to provide for the establishment of, and holding elections for, the new Seanad and the Presidency, as well as for other adaptations. The Presidential Establishment Act 1938 was passed after the Constitution had come into effect but before the first President, Douglas Hyde, took office.

New official stamps, seals, and papers marked "Éire" replaced those with "Saorstát Éireann"; in some cases immediately, in other cases after existing stocks had run out.

International response
When the new constitution was enacted, the British government, according to The New York Times "contented itself with a legalistic protest". Its protest took the form of a communiqué on 30 December 1937 in which the British stated:

The Eire (Confirmation of Agreements) Act 1938 provided that Eire would be the style in UK law for the Irish state.

The Irish Government received messages of goodwill from 268 United States congressmen including eight senators. The signatories expressed "their ardent congratulations on the birth of the State of Ireland and the consequent coming into effect of the new constitution", adding that "We regard the adoption of the new constitution and the emergence of the State of Ireland as events of the utmost importance."

References

Sources
Draft Constitution Dáil debates, 1937
 Application of Standing Orders: March 10
 First Reading: March 10
 Second Reading: May 11, 12, 13
 Committee Stage: May 25, 25 (ctd), 26, 26 (ctd), 28; June 1,  1 (ctd), 2, 2 (ctd), 3, 3 (ctd)
 Report Stage: June 4
 Committee Stage (return): June 9, 10
 Report Stage (return): June 14

Other primary sources
 
Plebiscite (Draft Constitution) Act 1937: Statute: Debates
Constitution (Consequential Provisions) Act 1937: Statute: Debates

Secondary sources
 
 
 The Origins of the Irish Constitution project of the Royal Irish Academy with documents covering the period 1929 to 1941.

Citations

Further reading
 

1937 in Irish law
1937 in Irish politics
Ireland 1937
Constitution of Ireland
Éamon de Valera
Government in the Irish Free State
History of the Republic of Ireland
Ireland and the Commonwealth of Nations
December 1937 events
00
July 1937 events
 Constitutional 1937